Statistics of Swedish football Division 3 for the 2000 season.

League standings

Norra Norrland 2000

Mellersta Norrland 2000

Södra Norrland 2000

Norra Svealand 2000

Östra Svealand 2000

Västra Svealand 2000

Nordöstra Götaland 2000

Nordvästra Götaland 2000

Mellersta Götaland 2000

Sydöstra Götaland 2000

Sydvästra Götaland 2000

Södra Götaland 2000

Footnotes

References 

Swedish Football Division 3 seasons
4
Sweden
Sweden